Ahmad Badreddin Wais (born 15 January 1991) is a Syrian cyclist and Olympian, who currently rides for UCI Continental team . He represents the refugee team at the Olympics. He rode in the time trial at the UCI Road World Championships in 2017, 2018, 2019 and 2020.

Biography 
Ahmad Badreddin Wais was born January 15, 1991, in Aleppo, Syria. He would begin cycling at age 14, and go onto to compete in the 2009 UCI Juniors World Championship. Wais would continue training through the Syrian Civil War his family leaving him as they fled to Turkey in 2013. He would live alone in Damascus as a student until 2014, when he decided to leave the country as a refugee.

In 2014 Wais would begin his journey as a refugee, traveling by car through Syria and Lebanon, ultimately taking a boat to Turkey to reunite with his family. He would then travel by ship to Greece and eventually gain refugee status in Switzerland which he arrived in by plane. Wais would not compete again until 2017, citing the physical and emotional toll of the ordeal; going so far as to put off training until 2015. In 2016, he was a member of the Dutch Marco Polo team.

He would become a prospective candidate for the 2016 Refugee Olympic Team. 

Wais has not returned to Syria since leaving, because he is classified as having evaded conscription by the Syrian Military.

He did not attend the 2016 Olympics, however two female swimmers from Syria were selected for the very small refugee team. By 2020 his country was still in a state of civil war and this time he was named to the Olympic team, which took place in 2021 due to the worldwide pandemic. He rode in the individual time trial event.

References

External links

SRF.ch video

1991 births
Living people
Syrian male cyclists
Refugees of the Syrian civil war
Sportspeople from Aleppo
Competitors at the 2018 Mediterranean Games
Mediterranean Games competitors for Syria
Refugee Olympic Team at the 2020 Summer Olympics
Cyclists at the 2020 Summer Olympics